Adriaan van Royen (11 November 1704 in Leiden – 28 February 1779 in Leiden) was a Dutch botanist. He was a professor at Leiden University and is associated with Carl Linnaeus.

He is best known for his work on flora of Southeast Asia. Adriaan van Royen formed a close relationship with Linnaeus, who had visited the Leiden Botanic Garden during a stay in Leiden between 1737 and 1738.

He was elected a Fellow of the Royal Society in 1728.

He died in Leiden in 1779.

The genus Royena L. (= Diospyros sect. Royena (L.) F.White), in the Ebenaceae, and Melastoma royenii Blume. Sutton, D.A. are named after him.

References

1704 births
1779 deaths
People from Leiden
18th-century Dutch botanists
Academic staff of Leiden University
Fellows of the Royal Society